XHCOC-FM is a radio station on 99.7 FM in Colima, Colima. The station is owned by Grupo ACIR and carries its Exa FM pop music format.

History
XHCOC began as XECOC-AM 1430, with a concession awarded to Radio Creatividad, S.A., on October 11, 1993. It was sold to Grupo ACIR in 1998 and migrated to FM in 2011.

References

Radio stations in Colima
Grupo ACIR